Awlad an-Nama, also transcribed as Oulad Nemma, (Berber : ⵓⵍⴰⴷ ⵏⴻⵎⵎⴰ) is a town in Fquih Ben Salah Province, Béni Mellal-Khénifra, Morocco. It recorded a population of 60,076 in the 2014 Moroccan census, up from 51,049 in the 2004 census.

References

Populated places in Fquih Ben Salah Province
Municipalities of Morocco